Adityapur (also known as Alipur) is a village in the Dulhanbazar block of Patna district in the state Bihar of India. Adityapur is a small village and is a neighbour of the village Ullar (which is famous for an oldest Sun temple which was believed that build by lord Krishna's son Samb)

Agriculture
The main crops are rice, wheat, pea, sugarcane and gram.

Festivals
Chhath, Holi, Diwali, and Durga puja.

Location
Village is located on National Highway 98 People can take Bihta by train from Patna, and take bus or auto. from Bihta rl station.

References 

Villages in Patna district